Cusco, often spelled Cuzco (()), is a city in Southeastern Peru near the Urubamba Valley of the Andes mountain range. It is the capital of the Cusco Region and of the Cusco Province. The city is the seventh most populous in Peru; in 2017, it had a population of 428,450.

The city was the capital of the Inca Empire from the 13th century until the 16th-century Spanish conquest. In 1983, Cusco was declared a World Heritage Site by UNESCO with the title "City of Cuzco". It has become a major tourist destination, hosting nearly 2 million visitors a year. The Constitution of Peru (1993) designates it as the Historical Capital of Peru.

Spelling and etymology
Although the name was used in Southern Quechua, its origin is found in the Aymara language. The word is derived from the phrase  ('rock of the owl'), related to the city's foundation myth of the Ayar siblings. According to this legend, Ayar Awqa acquired wings and flew to the site of the future city; there he was transformed into a rock to mark the possession of the land by his  ("lineage"):

, pronounced as in 16th-century Spanish, seems to have been a close approximation to the Cusco Quechua pronunciation of the name at the time.

As both Spanish and Quechua pronunciation have evolved since then, the Spanish pronunciation of 'z' is no longer universally close to the Quechua pronunciation. In 1976, the city mayor signed an ordinance banning the traditional spelling and ordering the use of a new spelling, in municipality publications. Nineteen years later, on 23 June 1990, the local authorities formalized a new spelling more closely related to Quechua, Qosqo, but later administrations have not followed suit.

There is no international, official spelling of the city's name. In English-language publications both "s" and "z" can be found.  The Oxford Dictionary of English and Merriam-Webster Dictionary prefer "Cuzco", and in scholarly writings "Cuzco" is used more often than "Cusco". The city's international airport code is CUZ, reflecting the earlier Spanish spelling.

History

Killke culture

The Killke people occupied the region from 900 to 1200 CE, prior to the arrival of the Inca in the 13th century. Carbon-14 dating of Saksaywaman, the walled complex outside Cusco, established that Killke constructed the fortress about 1100 CE. The Inca later expanded and occupied the complex in the 13th century. In March 2008, archeologists discovered the ruins of an ancient temple, roadway and aqueduct system at Saksaywaman. Together with the results of excavations in 2007, when another temple was found at the edge of the fortress, this indicates a longtime religious as well as military use of the facility.

Inca history

Cusco was long an important center of indigenous people. It was the capital of the Inca Empire (13th century – 1532). Many believe that the city was planned as an effigy in the shape of a puma, a sacred animal. How Cusco was specifically built, or how its large stones were quarried and transported to the site remain undetermined. Under the Inca, the city had two sectors: the urin and hanan. Each was divided to encompass two of the four provinces, Chinchasuyu (NW), Antisuyu (NE), Kuntisuyu (SW) and Qullasuyu (SE). A road led from each quarter to the corresponding quarter of the empire.

Each local leader was required to build a house in the city and live part of the year in Cusco, restricted to the quarter that corresponded to the quarter in which he held territory. After the rule of Pachacuti, when an Inca died, his title went to one son and his property was given to a corporation controlled by his other relatives (split inheritance). Each title holder had to build a new house and add new lands to the empire in order to own land for his family to keep after his death.

According to Inca legend, the city was rebuilt by Sapa Inca Pachacuti, the man who transformed the Kingdom of Cuzco from a sleepy city-state into the vast empire of Tawantinsuyu. Archeological evidence, however, points to a slower, more organic growth of the city beginning before Pachacuti. The city was constructed according to a definite plan in which two rivers were channeled around the city. Archeologists have suggested that this city plan was replicated at other sites.

The city fell to the sphere of Huáscar during the Inca Civil War after the death of Huayna Capac in 1528. It was captured by the generals of Atahualpa in April 1532 in the Battle of Quipaipan. Nineteen months later, Spanish explorers invaded the city after kidnapping and murdering Atahualpa (see Battle of Cuzco), and gained control because of their arms and horses, employing superior military technology.

After the Spanish invasion

The first three Spaniards arrived in the city in May 1533, after the Battle of Cajamarca, collecting for Atahualpa's Ransom Room. On 15 November 1533 Francisco Pizarro officially arrived in Cusco. "The capital of the Incas ... astonished the Spaniards by the beauty of its edifices, the length and regularity of its streets." The great square was surrounded by several palaces, since "each sovereign built a new palace for himself." "The delicacy of the stone work excelled" that of the Spaniards'. The fortress had three parapets and was composed of "heavy masses of rock". "Through the heart of the capital ran a river ... faced with stone. ... The most sumptuous edifice in Cuzco ... was undoubtedly the great temple dedicated to the Sun ... studded with gold plates ... surrounded by convents and dormitories for the priests. ... The palaces were numerous and the troops lost no time in plundering them of their contents, as well as despoiling the religious edifices," including the royal mummies in the Coricancha.

Pizarro ceremoniously gave Manco Inca the Incan fringe as the new Peruvian leader. Pizarro encouraged some of his men to stay and settle in the city, giving out repartimientos, or land grants to do so. Alcaldes were established and regidores on 24 March 1534, which included the brothers Gonzalo Pizarro and Juan Pizarro. Pizarro left a garrison of 90 men and departed for Jauja with Manco Inca.

Pizarro renamed it as the "very noble and great city of Cuzco". Buildings often constructed after the Spanish invasion have a mixture of Spanish influence and Inca indigenous architecture, including the Santa Clara and San Blas neighborhoods. The Spanish destroyed many Inca buildings, temples and palaces. They used the remaining walls as bases for the construction of a new city, and this stone masonry is still visible.

Father Vincente de Valverde became the Bishop of Cusco and built his cathedral facing the plaza. He supported construction of the Dominican Order monastery (Santo Domingo Convent) on the ruins of the Corichanca, House of the Sun, and a convent at the former site of the House of the Virgins of the Sun.

During the Siege of Cuzco of 1536 by Manco Inca Yupanqui, a leader of the Sapa Inca, he took control of the city from the Spanish. Although the siege lasted 10 months, it was ultimately unsuccessful. Manco's forces were able to reclaim the city for only a few days. He eventually retreated to Vilcabamba, the capital of the newly established small Neo-Inca State. There his state survived another 36 years but he was never able to return to Cuzco. Throughout the conflict and years of the Spanish colonization of the Americas, many Incas died of smallpox epidemics, as they had no acquired immunity to a disease by then endemic among Europeans.

Cusco was built on layers of cultures. The Tawantinsuyu (former Inca Empire) was built on Killke structures. The Spanish replaced indigenous temples with Catholic churches, and Inca palaces with mansions for the invaders.

Cusco was the center for the Spanish colonization and spread of Christianity in the Andean world. It became very prosperous thanks to agriculture, cattle raising and mining, as well as its trade with Spain. The Spanish colonists constructed many churches and convents, as well as a cathedral, university and archdiocese.

Present

A major earthquake on 21 May hit in 1950, and caused damage in more than one third of the city's structures. The Dominican Priory and Church of Santo Domingo, which were built on top of the impressive Qurikancha (Temple of the Sun), were among the affected colonial era buildings. Inca architecture withstood the earthquake. Many of the old Inca walls were at first thought to have been lost after the earthquake, but the granite retaining walls of the Qurikancha were exposed, as well as those of other ancient structures throughout the city. Restoration work at the Santo Domingo complex exposed the Inca masonry formerly obscured by the superstructure without compromising the integrity of the colonial heritage. Many of the buildings damaged in 1950 had been impacted by an earthquake only nine years previously.

Since the 1990s, tourism has increased. Currently, Cusco is the most important tourist destination in Peru. Under the administration of mayor Daniel Estrada Pérez, a staunch supporter of the Academia Mayor de la Lengua Quechua, between 1983 and 1995 the Quechua name Qosqo was officially adopted for the city. Tourism in the city was drastically affected by the COVID-19 pandemic in Peru and the 2022–2023 Peruvian protests, with the latter event costing the are 10 million soles daily.

Honors 
In 1933, the Congress of Americanists met in La Plata, Argentina, and declared the city as the Archeological Capital of the Americas.
In 1978, the 7th Convention of Mayors of Great World Cities met in Milan, Italy, and declared Cusco a Cultural Heritage of the World.
In 1983, UNESCO, in Paris, France, declared the city a World Heritage Site. The Peruvian government declared it the Tourism Capital of Peru and Cultural Heritage of the Nation.
In 2001, in Cusco, the Latin American Congress of Aldermen and Councillors awarded Cusco the title of Historical Capital of Latinamerica.
In 2007 the Organización Capital Americana de la Cultura awarded Cusco the title of Cultural Capital of America.
In 2007, the New7Wonders Foundation designated Machu Picchu one of the New Seven Wonders of the World, following a worldwide poll.

Geography

Cusco extends throughout the Huatanay (or Watanay) river valley. To its north is the Vilcabamba mountain range with  mountains.

Climate
Cusco has a subtropical highland climate (Köppen Cwb). It is generally dry and temperate, with two defined seasons. Summer occurs from October through April, with warm temperatures and abundant rainfall; November is the warmest month, averaging . Although frost and hail are common, the last reported snowfall was in June 1911. Sunshine hours peak in July, the equivalent of January in the Northern Hemisphere. In contrast, February, the equivalent of August in the Northern Hemisphere, has the least sunshine.

Cusco was found in 2006 to be the spot on Earth with the highest average ultraviolet light level.

Tourism 
Tourism has been the backbone to the economy since the early 2000s, bringing in more than 1.2 million tourists per year. In 2002, the income Cusco received from tourism was US$837 million. In 2009, that number increased to US$2.47 billion. Due to the COVID-19 pandemic, tourism has dropped by a significant amount.

Main sites

The indigenous Killke culture built the walled complex of Sacsayhuamán about 1100. The Killke built a major temple near Saksaywaman, as well as an aqueduct (Pukyus) and roadway connecting prehistoric structures. Sacsayhuamán was expanded by the Inca.

The Spanish explorer Pizarro sacked much of the Inca city in 1535. Remains of the palace of the Incas, Qurikancha (the Temple of the Sun), and the Temple of the Virgins of the Sun still stand. Inca buildings and foundations in some cases proved to be stronger during earthquakes than foundations built in present-day Peru. Among the most noteworthy Spanish colonial buildings of the city is the Cathedral of Santo Domingo.

The major nearby Inca sites are Pachacuti's presumed winter home, Machu Picchu, which can be reached on foot by the Inca Trail to Machu Picchu or by train; and the "fortress" at Ollantaytambo.

The surrounding area, located in the Watanay Valley, is strong in gold mining and agriculture, including corn, barley, quinoa, tea and coffee.

Cusco's main stadium Estadio Garcilaso de la Vega was one of seven stadiums used when Peru hosted South America's continental soccer championship, the Copa América, in 2004. The stadium is home to one of the country's most successful soccer clubs, Cienciano.

The city is served by Alejandro Velasco Astete International Airport.

Architectural heritage 

Because of its antiquity and importance, the city center retains many buildings, plazas, streets and churches from colonial times, and even some pre-Columbian structures, which led to its declaration as a World Heritage Site by UNESCO in 1983. Among the main sights of the city are:

Barrio de San Blas 
This neighborhood houses artisans, workshops and craft shops. It is one of the most picturesque sites in the city. Its streets are steep and narrow with old houses built by the Spanish over important Inca foundations. It has an attractive square and the oldest parish church in Cusco, built in 1563, which has a carved wooden pulpit considered the epitome of Colonial era woodwork in Cusco.

The Quechua name of this neighborhood is Tuq'ukachi, which means the opening of the salt.

Hatun Rumiyuq 
This street is the most visited by tourists. On the street Hatun Rumiyoq ("the one with the big stone") was the palace of Inca Roca, which was converted to the Archbishop's residence.

Along this street that runs from the Plaza de Armas to the Barrio de San Blas, one can see the Stone of Twelve Angles, which is viewed as a marvel of ancient stonework and has become emblematic of the city's history.

Basílica de la Merced 

Its foundation dates from 1536. The first complex was destroyed by the earthquake of 1650. Its rebuilding was completed in 1675.

Its cloisters of Baroque Renaissance style, choir stalls, colonial paintings and wood carvings are highlights, now a popular museum.

Cathedral 

The first cathedral built in Cusco is the Iglesia del Triunfo, built in 1539 on the foundations of the Palace of Viracocha Inca. Today, this church is an auxiliary chapel of the cathedral.

The main basilica cathedral of the city was built between 1560 and 1664. The main material used was stone, which was extracted from nearby quarries, although some blocks of red granite were taken from the fortress of Saksaywaman.

This great cathedral presents late-Gothic, Baroque and plateresque interiors and has one of the most outstanding examples of colonial goldwork. Its carved wooden altars are also important.

The city developed a distinctive style of painting known as the "Cuzco School" and the cathedral houses a major collection of local artists of the time. The cathedral is known for a Cusco School painting of the Last Supper depicting Jesus and the twelve apostles feasting on guinea pig, a traditional Andean delicacy.

The cathedral is the seat of the Archdiocese of Cuzco.

Plaza de Armas de Cusco 

Known as the "Square of the warrior" in the Inca era, this plaza has been the scene of several important events, such as the proclamation by Francisco Pizarro in the conquest of Cuzco.Similarly, the Plaza de Armas was the scene of the death of Túpac Amaru II, considered the indigenous leader of the resistance.

The Spanish built stone arcades around the plaza which endure to this day. The main cathedral and the Church of La Compañía both open directly onto the plaza.

The cast iron fountain in Plaza de Armas was manufactured by Janes, Beebe & Co.

Iglesia de la Compañía de Jesús

This church (Church of the Society of Jesus), whose construction was initiated by the Jesuits in 1576 on the foundations of the Amarucancha or the palace of the Inca ruler Wayna Qhapaq, is considered one of the best examples of colonial baroque style in the Americas.

Its façade is carved in stone and its main altar is made of carved wood covered with gold leaf. It was built over an underground chapel and has a valuable collection of colonial paintings of the Cusco School.

Qurikancha and Convent of Santo Domingo 

The Qurikancha ("golden place") was the most important sanctuary dedicated to the Sun God (Inti) at the time of the Inca Empire. According to ancient chronicles written by Garcilaso de la Vega (chronicler), Qurikancha was said to have featured a large solid golden disc that was studded with precious stones and represented the Inca Sun God – Inti. Spanish chroniclers describe the Sacred Garden in front of the temple as a garden of golden plants with leaves of beaten gold, stems of silver, solid gold corn-cobs and 20 life-size llamas and their herders all in solid gold.

The temple was destroyed by its Spanish invaders who, as they plundered, were determined to rid the city of its wealth, idolaters and shrines. Nowadays, only a curved outer wall and partial ruins of the inner temple remain at the site.

With this structure as a foundation, colonists built the Convent of Santo Domingo in the Renaissance style. The building, with one baroque tower, exceeds the height of many other buildings in this city.

Inside is a large collection of paintings from the Cuzco School.

Museums

Cusco has the following important museums:

Museo de Arte Precolombino
Casa Concha Museum (Machu Picchu Museum)
Museo Inka
Museo Histórico Regional de Cuzco
Centro de Textiles Tradicionales del Cuzco or Center of the Traditional Textiles of Cusco in English
Museum of Sacred, Magical and Medicinal Plants (Museo de plantas sagradas, mágicas y medicinales)
ChocoMuseo (The Cacao and Chocolate Museum)

There are also some museums located at churches.

Population

The city had a population of about 434,114 people in 2013 and 434,654 people in 2015 according to INEI.

Cuisine
As capital to the Inca Empire, Cusco was an important agricultural region. It was a natural reserve for thousands of native Peruvian species, including around 3,000 varieties of potato cultivated by the people. Fusion and neo-Andean restaurants developed in Cusco, in which the cuisine is prepared with modern techniques and incorporates a blend of traditional Andean and international ingredients.

Twin towns – sister cities

Cusco is twinned with:

 Bethlehem, Palestine
 Baguio, Philippines
 Copán Ruinas, Honduras
 Cuenca, Ecuador
 Havana, Cuba
 Jersey City, United States
 Jerusalem, Israel
 Kaesong, North Korea
 Kraków, Poland
 Mexico City, Mexico
 Moscow, Russia
 La Paz, Bolivia
 Potosí, Bolivia
 Puebla, Mexico
 Rio de Janeiro, Brazil
 Samarkand, Uzbekistan
 Tempe, United States

See also

History of Cusco
List of buildings and structures in Cusco
Colonial Cusco Painting School
Governorate of New Castile
Inca religion in Cusco
Inca road system
Iperu, tourist information and assistance
List of archaeoastronomical sites sorted by country
PeruRail
Peru's Challenge
Pikillaqta
Santurantikuy
Tampukancha, Inca religious site
Tourism in Peru
Wanakawri

Notes

References

Bibliography

External links

Cusco official website
Old map of Cusco, Historic Cities site

 
Populated places in the Cusco Region
Archaeological sites in Peru
World Heritage Sites in Peru
Cities in Peru
Capitals of former nations
Populated places established in the 10th century
11th-century establishments in South America
13th-century establishments in the Inca civilization
16th-century disestablishments in the Inca civilization
1533 establishments in the Spanish Empire
Populated places established in 1533
Regional capital cities in Peru